Paanch Fauladi is a 1988 Indian Hindi-language action film directed by Mohan Bhakri. It stars Raj Babbar, Javed Khan, Dara Singh and Amjad Khan in pivotal roles.

Cast
 Dara Singh as Ustad (Fauladi 1)
 Raj Babbar as Raja (Fauladi 2)
 Hemant Birje as (Fauladi 3)
 Javed Khan as (Fauladi 4)
 Amjad Khan as Dilawar Khan (Fauladi 5)
 Salma Agha as Julie
 Anita Raj as Annu
 Ram Mohan as Zamindar Shamsher Singh
 Bob Christo as Seth (Englishman)
 Raza Murad as Jarawar Singh
 Huma Khan as Jarawar Singh's mistress
 Seema Deo as Parvati

Soundtrack

References

External links

1980s Hindi-language films
1988 films
Indian action drama films